The 2016–17 FIS Cross-Country World Cup was the 36th official World Cup season in cross-country skiing for men and women. The season started on 26 November 2016 in Ruka, Finland, and ended on 19 March 2017 in Quebec City, Canada.

Calendar

Men

Women

Men's team

Women's team

Men's standings

Overall

Distance

Sprint

Prize money

Helvetia U23

Audi Quattro Bonus Ranking

Women's standings

Overall

Distance

Sprint

Prize money

Helvetia U23

Audi Quattro Bonus Ranking

Nations Cup

Overall

Men

Women

Points distribution 
The table shows the number of points won in the 2016/17 Cross-Country Skiing World Cup for men and ladies.

Achievements 
Only individual events.

First World Cup career victory

Men
  Sindre Bjørnestad Skar, 24, in his 7th season – the WC 8 (sprint F) in Toblach; first podium was 2014–15 WC 15 (sprint F) in Lahti
  Gleb Retivykh, 25, in his 7th season – the WC 12 (sprint C) in Pyeongchang; also first podium
  Johannes Høsflot Klæbo, 20, in his 2nd season - the WC 14 (sprint F) in Otepää; first podium was 2016–17 WC 1 (sprint C) in Ruka 

Women
  Anamarija Lampič, 21, in her 4th season – the WC 12 (sprint C) in Pyeongchang; also first podium

Women

First World Cup podium

Men
  Johannes Høsflot Klæbo, 20, in his 2nd season – no. 3 in the WC 1 (sprint C) in Kuusamo
  Simen Hegstad Krüger, 23, in his 5th season – no. 3 in the WC 7 (10 km F) in Toblach
  Gleb Retivykh, 25, in his 7th season – no. 1 in the WC 12 (sprint C) in Pyeongchang
  Daniel Stock, 24, in his 4th season – no. 2 in the WC 13 (30 km skiathlon) in Pyeongchang
  Mathias Rundgreen, 25, in his 4th season – no. 3 in the WC 13 (30 km skiathlon) in Pyeongchang

Women
  Sadie Bjornsen, 27, in her 7th season – no. 3 in the WC 7 (5 km F) in Toblach
  Anamarija Lampič, 21, in her 4th season – no. 1 in the WC 12 (sprint C) in Pyeongchang
  Silje Øyre Slind, 28, in her 6th season – no. 2 in the WC 12 (sprint C) in Pyeongchang
  Ida Sargent, 29, in her 7th season – no. 3 in the WC 12 (sprint C) in Pyeongchang

Victories in this World Cup (all-time number of victories in parentheses)

Men
  Sergey Ustiugov, 7 (11) first places
  Martin Johnsrud Sundby, 5 (29) first places
  Johannes Høsflot Klæbo, 3 (3) first places
  Alex Harvey, 2 (6) first places
  Calle Halfvarsson, 2 (3) first places
  Federico Pellegrino, 1 (9) first place
  Eirik Brandsdal, 1 (9) first place
  Finn Hågen Krogh, 1 (8) first place
  Maurice Manificat, 1 (7) first place
  Marcus Hellner, 1 (5) first place
  Pål Golberg, 1 (4) first place
  Matti Heikkinen, 1 (4) first place
  Emil Iversen, 1 (4) first place
  Iivo Niskanen, 1 (2) first place
  Petr Sedov, 1 (2) first place
  Sindre Bjørnestad Skar, 1 (1) first place
  Gleb Retivykh, 1 (1) first place

Women
  Stina Nilsson, 9 (12) first places
  Marit Bjørgen, 8 (110) first places
  Heidi Weng, 5 (8) first places
  Ingvild Flugstad Østberg, 2 (7) first places
  Jessie Diggins, 2 (3) first places
  Justyna Kowalczyk, 1 (50) first place
  Maiken Caspersen Falla, 1 (13) first place
  Krista Pärmäkoski, 1 (2) first place
  Natalya Matveyeva, 1 (2) first place
  Anamarija Lampič, 1 (1) first place

Retirements
Following are notable cross-country skiers who announced their retirement:

Men

Women

References

 
FIS Cross-Country World Cup seasons
2016 in cross-country skiing
2017 in cross-country skiing
Cross country